Riverside Local School District, formerly named Painesville Township Local School District until July 1, 2007, is a primary/secondary school district in Ohio.

Location
The Riverside Local School District encompasses the following locations of Lake County, Ohio:
Painesville Township, Ohio
Concord Township, Ohio
Leroy Township, Ohio
Grand River, Ohio

Buildings
The Riverside Local School District has one high school campus for both junior and senior high school students, one middle school, and four elementary schools.

High school
Riverside High School is the only high school in the district. Students in grades ten through twelve attend Riverside. On the same campus, and connected to Riverside by the Campus Library, is John R. Williams Junior High School, which encompasses students in grades eight and nine. Students in all grades often take classes in both buildings.

Middle school
Henry F. LaMuth Middle School (Auburn Middle School until around 2000)  is the only middle school in the district. District students in grades 6 and 7 attend LaMuth.

Classes
You will get to pick whether to join band, with Mr. Swisslocki teaching, or choir, with Mr. Allen. Other than the core and music classes, students will also get special classes, art, computer, and gym for 12 weeks each.

Elementary schools
There are four elementary schools in the Riverside Local School District. Each elementary school has students from kindergarten through grade five. Each elementary school is part of the Ohio Reads tutoring program in conjunction with Riverside High School's National Honor Society program and each elementary school's after-school supervision program.
Buckeye Elementary - in Concord
Parkside Elementary - in Concord
Riverview Elementary in Painesville
Melridge Elementary - in Concord.

New Facilities 
In November 2016 the residents of Painesville Township voted to approve a bond levy that allows the Riverside Local School District to construct two new elementary schools to replace four older ones. These buildings began construction in early 2018.

Zoning Issues
During the final planning stages of the new Concord Township school the Concord Township Board of Zoning Appeal's heard from the public and decided to deny the permit for the district to build on a plot of land it had purchased. The district later decided to take the Board of Zoning Appeal's to court where they reached a final settlement where the district agreed to change some aspects of its new school including the removal of the planned baseball field as well as meeting with the township and sheriffs for an outdoor security lighting schedule. In return the township agreed to allow the district to build on the plot of land it had purchased.

References

External links

School districts in Ohio
Education in Lake County, Ohio
School districts established in 2007